Thiotricha lindsayi is a moth of the family Gelechiidae. It was described by Philpott in 1927. It is found in New Zealand.

The wingspan is about 15 mm. The forewings are purplish-brown with a sprinkling of whitish scales, especially on the posterior half. The hindwings are fuscous.

Larvae cause beech defoliation.

References

Moths described in 1927
Thiotricha
Moths of New Zealand